Joyce Tang Lai-ming (born 20 January 1976, in Hong Kong) is an actress of Television Broadcasts Limited (TVB). She entered the show business via the New Talent Singing Awards in 1995. She is better known to viewers as a tough woman mostly due to her characters in dramas, particularly her role as “Chan Sam Yuen” in Armed Reaction

In 2008, she starred in War of In-Laws II as Coco Ko, along with co-star Derek Kok.

Personal life

After working together in the Series Armed Reaction in 1998, Joyce Tang and Marco Ngai started dating and had a 9-year relationship. At that time, Hong Kong fans and entertainment were waiting for a wedding of the century from a beautiful love story, she suddenly announced her breakup. The reason Marco Ngai betrayed her and came to a young actress Zhang Lihua . He was turned away by everyone and even affected his career.

And Joyce Tang - after the cooperation in the movie Wars of In-Laws II - also dated the talented actor Derek Kok in 2007. But it wasn't long before the media exposed his private life, from which she knew the fact that he had a wife and children that had been hidden for so long. Immediately, Joyce ended her relationship with Derek.

On December 7, 2013, Joyce Tang married businessman Matthew Chu in Thailand after a period of learning and dating through the recommendation of friends. She and her husband decided that they will not have children and lived happily together until later. She also spends more time enjoying life with her husband and friends, so now Joyce Tang only participates in Sitcom Come Home Love: Lo and Behold. But unexpectedly, the fame of her character Hung Sheung Sin in the film is welcomed and loved so much. After many ups and downs, Joyce Tang finally had a happy family and a stable career.

Filmography

TV series

Films 
 Back to the Past (2019) 
 72 Tenants of Prosperity (2010)
 The Untold Story - The Lost World (2002)
 Prison on Fire - Preacher (2002)
 Those Were the Days (1996)
 Lost and Found (1996)

Host

Awards
Astro Wah Lai Toi Drama Award 2004 (Malaysia)
Favourite character (1 of 10): Chan Sam Yun (Armed Reaction IV)
Favourite children's song awards

References

External links
Official Sina Blog of Joyce Tang
Joyce Tang on Sina Weibo

1976 births
Living people
TVB veteran actors
Hong Kong television actresses
New Talent Singing Awards contestants
20th-century Hong Kong actresses
21st-century Hong Kong actresses